KKF may refer to:

 Kamal Kumari Foundation
 Khidmat-e-Khalq Foundation
 Khmers Kampuchea-Krom Federation
 Khpal Kor Foundation